Dihydropyrimidinase-related protein 4 is an enzyme that in humans is encoded by the DPYSL4 gene.

References

Further reading

External links